Arthur Fehring (4 May 1900 – 19 April 1983) was an Australian rules footballer who played for the Richmond Football Club in the Victorian Football League (VFL).

In the fourth round of the 1919 season, he played beside his brother Charlie, the only occasion that they would appear together in the same VFL game.

Notes

External links 

1900 births
1983 deaths
Australian rules footballers from Melbourne
Richmond Football Club players
Hawthorn Football Club (VFA) players
People from Collingwood, Victoria